Kosmos 215 ( meaning Cosmos 215), also known as DS-U1-A No.1, was a Soviet satellite which was launched in 1968 as part of the Dnepropetrovsk Sputnik programme. It was a  spacecraft, which was built by the Yuzhnoye Design Bureau, and was used to study radiation and conduct optical observations of the atmosphere of the Earth. It was equipped with eight telescopes, including one for ultraviolet astronomy. It was primarily used to study the Sun, although several other X-ray emissions were detected.

A Kosmos-2I 63SM carrier rocket was used to launch Kosmos 215 into low Earth orbit. The launch took place from Site 86/4 at Kapustin Yar. It occurred at 22:29:52 GMT on 18 April 1968, and resulted in the successfully insertion of the satellite into orbit. Upon reaching orbit, the satellite was assigned its Kosmos designation, and received the International Designator 1968-033A. The North American Air Defense Command assigned it the catalogue number 03205.

Kosmos 215 performed ultraviolet photometry of 36 A and B stars from parallel telescopes and two UV photometers with maximum responses at 274.0 and 227.5 nanometres. Its X-ray telescope was used to measure radiation between 0.05 and 0.5 nanometres.

Kosmos 215 was the only DS-U1-A satellite to be launched, and the fourth DS-U1 across all variants. It completed operations on 6 June 1968. On 30 June 1968, it decayed from orbit and reentered the atmosphere.

See also

1968 in spaceflight

References

Spacecraft launched in 1968
Kosmos satellites
Dnepropetrovsk Sputnik program